Ali Cemal Darmar (born May 13, 1946) is a Turkish pianist and composer. He had studied piano with Verda Un, Ferdi Statzer and Popi Mihailides in his early years. He has a degree in Pharmacy.

In 1974 he moved to Paris to study with Nadia Boulanger and Annette Dieudonne privately when he was also a registered student in Alfred Cortot's Ecole Normale de Musique de Paris - where he had studied with Germaine Mounier, Monique Deschaussées and Cécille de Brunhoff. Darmar had scholarships from UNESCO (1976) and the French government (1981). He graduated from the composition department of The Rueil-Malmaison Conservatory, under the direction of Mme Tony Aubin, then got another degree on composition from Jacques Castérède's class in the Ecole Normale De Musique.

His work is clearly a gathering of the previous Turkish composers and the Neo-Romanticist movement in the late 20th century France. 
His compositions include "Sümelâ" and "Metamorphose", for Orchestra "Metro' da", Ballet preludes for piano, a sonata, dance for two pianos, "Kâtibim", fantasy songs for choir and leads, Concerto for piano and Orchestra, "Through the silence" for Violin and Piano.

Recently Anjelika Akbar, a concert pianist and a composer, performed at the Erzurum 2011 Winter Universiade preparations' gathering in Erzurum and her repertoire consisted of one of Darmar's compositions, along with the works of Johann Sebastian Bach, Ulvi Cemal Erkin and Ilhan Baran.

Darmar works with Anjelika Akbar since 2003.
He now resides in Istanbul and continues to teach piano.

References

External links 
Turkish Music Portal

Turkish composers
1946 births
Living people